Hotel Partners is an independent hotel group which owns and operates hotels across Ireland and the United Kingdom.

It currently operates eight hotels across Ireland, including the five-star Fitzwilliam Hotels in Dublin and Belfast, the four-star Lough Rea Hotel & Spa in Galway, Trim Castle in Meath and the Park Plaza Hotel, Belfast.

Notable hotels and bars owned and operated by Hotel Partners
 The Bailey Bar, Dublin 2
Fitzwilliam Hotel, Dublin 2
 Fitzwilliam Hotel, Belfast
 Glover's Alley Restaurant, Dublin 2
Lough Erne Resort, Enniskillen
Lough Rea Hotel & Spa, Galway
Park Plaza Hotel, Belfast
 Park Plaza Hotel, Tyrrellstown, Dublin 15
 Trim Castle Hotel, County Meath

References

Hospitality companies of Ireland